Bala Panjara (Kannada: ಬಾಳ ಪಂಜರ) is a 1972 Indian Kannada film, directed by M. R. Vittal and produced by Indian National Pictures (P) Ltd. The film stars Pandari Bai, Shailashree, K. S. Ashwath and Ranga in the lead roles. The film has musical score by Vijaya Bhaskar.

Cast

Pandari Bai
Shailashree
K. S. Ashwath
Ranga
Narasimharaju
Rama
Jejamma
Malashree
Indrani
Kumari Savithri
Sampath
Chethan
Thoogudeepa Srinivas
Somashekar
Narayan
Master Ganesh
Master Ravishankar
Master Nagaraj
Master Kanti
Master Ravi

 Mastar Santosh

References

1970s Kannada-language films
Films scored by Vijaya Bhaskar